EinsPlus was a German free-to-air television channel owned by ARD and operated by SWR. The channel launched on 29 August 1997 under the name EinsMuXx, and was renamed EinsPlus on 23 April 2005.

The channel, along with ZDFkultur was closed on 30 September 2016.

Programming
 ARD-Buffet (2006–2012)
 Auf 3 Sofas durch ... (2012–2016)
 Crowdspondent - Deine persönlichen Reporter (2014)
 extra 3 (2009–2016)
 In Deutschland um die Welt (2013–2016)
 leben! Was Menschen bewegt (2009–2013)
 Nachtcafé (2009–2010)
 Walulis sieht fern (2012–2016)
 WTF?! Wissen - Testen - Forschen (2013–2015)

Logos and identities

References

External links

EinsPlus homepage

Südwestrundfunk
ARD (broadcaster)
Defunct television channels in Germany
Television channels and stations established in 1997
Television channels and stations disestablished in 2016
German-language television stations
1997 establishments in Germany
2016 disestablishments in Germany